Narasapur railway station (station code:NS) is an Indian Railways station in Narasapuram town of Andhra Pradesh. It is a terminal station on the Bhimavaram–Narasapur branch line and is administered under Vijayawada railway division of South Coast Railway Zone.

Classification 
In terms of earnings and outward passengers handled, Narasapur is categorized as a Non-Suburban Grade-4 (NSG-4) railway station. Based on the re–categorization of Indian Railway stations for the period of 2017–18 and 2022–23, an NSG–4 category station earns between – crore and handles  passengers.

Station amenities 
It is one of the 38 stations in the division to be equipped with Automatic Ticket Vending Machines (ATVMs).

Originating Express Trains

References 

Railway stations in West Godavari district
Railway stations opened in 1916
Vijayawada railway division